The 1957 British Grand Prix was a Formula One motor race held on 20 July 1957 at the Aintree Circuit, near Liverpool. It was the tenth British Grand Prix and it was race 5 of 8 in the 1957 World Championship of Drivers. The race was won by Stirling Moss and Tony Brooks, who shared driving duties in a Vanwall. It was the third and final time that a Grand Prix had been won by two drivers in a shared car. This was the first occasion that a British constructor won a World Drivers' Championship race, a feat achieved with two British drivers at their home Grand Prix.

Classification

Qualifying

Race

Notes
 – Includes 1 point for fastest lap
 – Trintignant received all 3 points for fourth place as it was determined that Collins did not drive a significant number of laps

Shared drives
 Car #20: Tony Brooks (26 laps) and Stirling Moss (64 laps). They shared the 8 points for first place
 Car #16: Maurice Trintignant (85 laps) and Peter Collins (3 laps). Trintignant received all 3 points for fourth place as it was determined that Collins did not drive a significant number of laps.
 Car #18: Stirling Moss (25 laps) and Tony Brooks (26 laps).

Championship standings after the race 
Drivers' Championship standings

Note: Only the top five positions are included.

References

External links
Jenkinson, D. 1957. The 10th British Grand Prix. Motor Sport. XXXIII/8 (August 1957), pp. 420–421, 424

British Grand Prix
British Grand Prix
European Grand Prix
British Grand Prix
British Grand Prix